The 2016–17 Northwestern State Demons basketball team represented Northwestern State University during the 2016–17 NCAA Division I men's basketball season. The Demons, led by 18th-year head coach Mike McConathy, played their home games at Prather Coliseum in Natchitoches, Louisiana as members of the Southland Conference. They finished the season 13–16, 7–11 in Southland play to finish in a five-way tie for eighth place. They failed to qualify for the Southland tournament.

Previous season
The Demons finished the 2015–16 season with a record of 8–20, 5–13 in Southland play to finish in 12th place. As a result, they failed to qualify for the Southland tournament

Roster

Radio
Most games will be carried live on the Demon Sports Radio Network. There are three affiliates for the Demon Sports Radio Network.
KZBL (Flagship)
KSYR
KTEZ

Schedule and results

|-
!colspan=9 style=| Non-conference regular season

|-
!colspan=9 colspan=9 style=| Southland Conference regular season

See also
2016–17 Northwestern State Lady Demons basketball team

References

Northwestern State
Northwestern State Demons basketball seasons
Northwestern State Demons basketball
Northwestern State Demons basketball